Giallo a Venezia (Giallo in Venice) is a 1979 Italian giallo film directed by Mario Landi. The film released on December 31, 1979 in Italy and starred Leonora Fani. It is known primarily for its extremely graphic scenes of sex and gore, including a woman's leg being slowly sawed off with a long knife. There is also a Brazilian VHS version containing XXX scenes under the title Pesadelo em Veneza.

Synopsis
The film follows a detective investigating the murder of a married couple involving a sexually abusive cocaine addict husband while, at the same time, an unknown killer commits multiple grisly murders.

Cast 
Leonora Fani as Flavia
Jeff Blynn as Angelo De Paul
Gianni Dei as Fabio
Michele Renzullo as Andrea Caron
Eolo Capritti as Maestrin
Vassili Karis as Bruno Nielsen (as Vassili Karamesinis)
Giancarlo Del Duca as Alberto, the Coroner
Mariangela Giordano as Marzia (as Maria Angela Giordan)

Production
While filming the scene in which Mariangela Giordano was tied to a kitchen table, the telephone cords were put on her wrists and ankles so tight that they cut into her flesh. She had visible marks on those places for three months.

Reception
Moviefone gave a mixed review for the film, saying that it "is one worth seeing for fans of the subgenre" but that overall it was "simply not on par with most of the Italian greats". In the book Italian Horror Film Directors one critic noted that Giallo a Venezia is a "perfect example of how a filmmaker can go too far in his quest to achieve the perfect synthesis of horror and repulsion."

Paolo Mereghetti wrote that it: 

Horror author Brandon Halsey wrote:

References

External links
 
 
 Giallo a Venezia at Variety Distribution

1979 films
1970s Italian-language films
Italian horror thriller films
1970s erotic drama films
1970s slasher films
Italian erotic thriller films
Italian crime thriller films
1979 horror films
1970s erotic thriller films
1970s crime thriller films
1970s mystery thriller films
Crime horror films
Erotic slasher films
Horror drama films
Giallo films
Italian splatter films
1970s exploitation films
Italian slasher films
Films directed by Mario Landi
Films scored by Berto Pisano
Films set in Venice
1979 drama films
1970s Italian films